Bona fide (in Latin) or good faith  is a sincere intention to be fair, open and honest.

Bona fide or Bonafide may also refer to:

Music
 Bonafide (Maxi Priest album), 1990
 Bonafide (Jon B album), 1995
 Bona Fide (Wishbone Ash album), 2002
 Bone-A-Fide, 2005 album by Christian rapper T-Bone
 Bonafide (band), Swedish hard rock band

Other uses
Bonafide Pictures, Australian film production company

See also

 "Bonafide Girl", 2008 single by Shaggy
 Ex fida bona, a legal principle
 Bona (disambiguation)
 Fide (disambiguation)
 Fides (disambiguation)
 Good faith (disambiguation)